The FIBT World Championships 1934 took place in Engelberg, Switzerland (Two-man) and in Garmisch-Partenkirchen, Germany (Four-man).

Two man bobsleigh

Four man bobsleigh

Medal table

References
2-Man bobsleigh World Champions
4-Man bobsleigh World Champions

1934
1934 in Swiss sport
Sport in Garmisch-Partenkirchen
1934 in bobsleigh
International sports competitions hosted by Switzerland
Bobsleigh in Switzerland